Nanshan Temple may refer to:

 Nanshan Temple (Sanya), a Buddhist temple in Sanya, Hainan Province, People's Republic of China
 Nanshan Temple (Zhangzhou), a Buddhist temple in Zhangzhou, Fujian Province, People's Republic of China

Buddhist temple disambiguation pages